Lorenzo Remedi (born 7 June 1991) is an Italian professional footballer who plays as a midfielder for Aglianese.

Career
Remedi has played for Livorno and Pontedera.

On 15 January 2019, he signed with Arezzo.

On 15 January 2020 he joined Rimini on a 1.5-year contract.

On 22 July 2020 he moved to Aglianese in Serie D.

References

External links

1991 births
People from Viareggio
Sportspeople from the Province of Lucca
Living people
Italian footballers
Serie B players
Serie C players
U.S. Livorno 1915 players
U.S. Città di Pontedera players
A.S.G. Nocerina players
U.S. Gavorrano players
A.S. Pro Piacenza 1919 players
S.S. Arezzo players
A.S. Giana Erminio players
Rimini F.C. 1912 players
Aglianese Calcio 1923 players
Association football midfielders
Footballers from Tuscany